Province of Armagh may refer to
 Province of Armagh (Church of Ireland)
 Province of Armagh (Roman Catholic)

See also
 Ulster, secular province whose territory corresponds roughly to that of the Roman Catholic ecclesiastical province